The Black Knight is a 1954 British-American Technicolor adventure film directed by Tay Garnett and starring Alan Ladd as the title character and Peter Cushing and Patrick Troughton as two conspirators attempting to overthrow King Arthur. It is the last of Ladd's trilogy with Warwick Films, the others being The Red Beret and Hell Below Zero based on Hammond Innes' book The White South.

Plot
The blacksmith and swordsmith John (Alan Ladd) is tutored at the court of King Arthur (Anthony Bushell), but as a commoner he can't hope to win the hand of Lady Linet (Patricia Medina), daughter of the Earl of Yeonil (Harry Andrews). The Earl's castle is attacked by Saracens and Cornishmen — disguised as Vikings — and his wife is killed, making him lose his memory. The attack was part of a plot by the Saracen Sir Palamides (Peter Cushing) and the pagan Cornish King Mark (Patrick Troughton) to overthrow Arthur and Christianity and take over the country, whilst pretending to be Arthur's friends and allies  - Palamides is a knight of the round table and Mark has faked his own baptism.

John accuses Palamides' servant Bernard (Bill Brandon) of murder before Arthur, who grants him three months' grace to prove the accusation or face execution himself. Another knight, Sir Ontzlake (André Morell), takes pity on John and trains him in swordplay so that he can take on an alternative secret identity as the wandering Black Knight. The "Vikings" raid a newly founded monastery and take Lady Linet and its monks to Stonehenge for a pagan sacrifice, but the Black Knight arrives and saves her, closely followed by Arthur and his knights, who defeat the pagans and destroy Stonehenge.

Sir Palamides tricks the Lady Linet into his castle to try to get her to reveal the Black Knight's identity, but John is informed of this and saves her, still in disguise. Sir Ontzlake then sends him to King Mark's castle, where a pro-Arthur woodcarver shows him  a secret tunnel into the royal chambers. John arrives in time to overhear Mark and Palamides finalising their plot but Palamides beats him back to Camelot, tricking Arthur into thinking that the Black Knight is leading the Viking raids. John arrives dressed as the Black Knight and despite revealing his identity is briefly imprisoned until Lady Linet and Sir Ontzlake free him, with the latter standing bail for John to Arthur.

John returns to Mark's castle, where he traps Mark's forces and kidnaps Mark at swordpoint. The following morning the Saracens land near Camelot and Sir Palamides and Bernard trick their way into Camelot. Bernard stabs a man in Arthur's bed, only to find it is Mark and not Arthur. John chases Bernard and he falls from the battlements, whilst Arthur's knights trick the Saracens by replying to their fire-arrow signal, which was to have been the signal for the Cornish to join the Saracen attack. The knights defeat the Saracens beneath Camelot's walls, while inside them John beats Palamides single-handed. As a reward Arthur knights John and offers him the further boon of his "heart's desire". John asks to marry the Lady Linet and both she and Arthur accept.

Cast

Alan Ladd as John
Patricia Medina as Linet
André Morell as Sir Ontzlake
Harry Andrews as the Earl Of Yeonil
Peter Cushing as Sir Palamides
Patrick Troughton as King Mark
Anthony Bushell as King Arthur
 Bill Brandon as Bernard
Ronald Adam as the Abbott 
Jean Lodge as Queen Guinevere
 Laurence Naismith as Major Domo
 John Laurie as John
 Basil Appleby as 	Sir Hal
 Pauline Jameson as Lady Yeonil
 Olwen Brookes as 	Lady Ontzlake
 Elton Hayes as the Minstrel
 David Paltenghi as 	High Priest
 John Kelly as 	The Woodchopper

Production
The Black Knight was the fourth film Alan Ladd made outside the US in order to qualify for a tax exemption. His fee was $200,000 as against 10% of the gross.

Filming started in September 1953. Shooting took place at Pinewood Studios, with exterior shots filmed at Castell Coch, Wales, and on location in Ávila, Spain. Producer Irwin Allen called Spain "a wonderful country to make pictures in" because of its more than 2,000 old castles, twelve of which were used in the film. The film's sets were designed by the art director Alex Vetchinsky.

Halfway through production, Bryan Forbes was called in to do some rewriting of the script (he is credited as "additional dialogue by..."). According to Forbes's memoirs, Alan Ladd's wife and long-time agent, Sue Carol, had script approval and objected to a scene where her husband's character stole a horse. 'During a script conference she repeated "Alan Ladd does not steal a horse, period. I'm telling you. He steals a horse, we lose the Boy Scouts Association and the Daughters of the American Revolution, to say nothing of his fan club." Irving [Allen], the senior producer was equal to the occasion and replied "He's not stealing a horse, Sue, he's borrowing a horse. You know like a Hertz car." "So, show me the difference" said Mrs Ladd, "You keep the stolen horse in and you start looking for another star because we're gonna be on the next plane home." "How would it be" I said, "if we kept all the action up to the point where Mr Ladd disposes single-handedly of the attacking Vikings, then he runs to a sentry and says "Is that the horse I ordered?" The sentry nods in agreement and Mr Ladd jumps on the horse and rides over the drawbridge?" "Yeah, I'll buy that" said Mrs Ladd and that is what we shot.' She also instructed Forbes when writing dialogue for Ladd to "keep him monosyllabic".

Donald Sinden, then a contract star for the Rank Organisation at Pinewood Studios, had a permanent dressing room in the same block as Ladd's. He said "(Ladd) brought in his entourage a double-cum-stunt man who bore an uncanny resemblance to him. The double did all the long shots, most of the medium shots and even appeared in two-shots when the hero had his back to the camera. The 'star' only did eleven days work in the entire film. He was extremely short in stature and unless he was alone, the camera could never show his feet, because if he was stationary he was standing on a box; if walking, the other actors were in specially dug troughs or ditches and for anything between, all other actors were required to stand with their legs apart and their knees bent."

The title tune for the film was "The Whistling Gypsy". For this purpose it was given new lyrics by its songwriter, Leo Maguire, and Elton Hayes, who sang it in the film.

Assessments
One critic, Jeffrey Richards, thought Ladd badly miscast, "playing the part like a tired American businessman prevailed upon to take the lead in a revival of Merrie England". By contrast Andrews and Bushell "played their parts for all and more than they were worth, giving every one of the pseudo-archaic line (e.g., 'Away with him, his presence doth offend our sense of honour') the full treatment: resonant Shakespearean delivery and Lyceum flourishes".

A lot of footage from this film was re-used in the low-budget, 1963 matinée film Siege of the Saxons, which is also set in Arthurian times - even the short-sleeved signature armour of the Black Knight reappears for the sake of continuity.

References

External links

Review at Variety

1954 films
1954 adventure films
Arthurian films
British adventure films
Columbia Pictures films
1950s English-language films
Films directed by Tay Garnett
Paganism in Europe
Films scored by John Addison
Films set in castles
Films shot at Pinewood Studios
Films shot in the province of Ávila
Films shot in Wales
1950s British films
Fictional Muslims
Cornwall in fiction